UN Käerjéng 97 is a football club, based in Bascharage, in south-western Luxembourg.

History
A young club, it was only formed in 1997 as an amalgam of Union Sportive Bascharage and Jeunesse Hautcharage.

In the 2005–06 season, Käerjéng finished sixth in the National Division.  They finished second in their relegation group, but were already guaranteed their safety before they played any games in it.

Honours

As Jeunesse Hautcharage
Luxembourg Cup
Winners (1): 1970–71

European competition

As Jeunesse Hautcharage
Jeunesse Hautcharage qualified for UEFA European competition once.

UEFA Cup Winners' Cup
First round (1): 1971–72

On their first tie in Europe, they suffered the largest ever aggregate defeat in UEFA competition: 21–0 against Chelsea. Which to this date, is the largest ever aggregate score for an official UEFA football match
(but is equal with Feyenoord Rotterdam, who achieved the very same result against US Rumelange winning first leg 9–0 and second 12–0 in 1972–73 UEFA Cup)

As UN Käerjéng 97
UEFA Cup
Second qualifying round, 2007–08

After losing the previous season's cup final against F91 Dudelange UN Käerjéng 97 qualified for the UEFA Cup for the second time in the club's history, drawing Norwegian side Lillestrøm in the first qualifying round. Losing merely 2–1 away at Åråsen stadion in itself was a remarkable feat for the club, but after a very surprising 1–0 win at home, UN Käerjéng 97 was through to the second qualifying round on away goals after a 2–2 aggregate score.  UN Käerjéng 97 lost 4–0 in the second qualifying round to Standard Liège.

Thus, Käerjéng's overall European record is:

Former managers
 Angelo Fiorucci (July 1, 2000 – June 30, 2009)
 Claude Heinz (July 1, 2009 – Dec 8, 2009)
 Roland Schaack (Jan 1, 2010–)

Current squad

References

External links
UN Käerjéng 97 official website

Bascharage
Kaerjeng
Kaerjeng 97
1997 establishments in Luxembourg